Chakravartin Ashoka Samrat  (English: The Great Emperor Ashoka) is a 2015 Indian historical drama TV series that aired on Colors TV from 2 February 2015 to 7 October 2016. The show was created and written by author and screenwriter Faizan Mohammad and cast by Radhesh More. It stars Mohit Raina as Ashoka with Siddharth Nigam portraying the young version of the character.

Chakravartin Ashoka Samrat was based on the life of Emperor Ashoka (304–232 BCE), the third emperor of the Mauryan dynasty of India. The series tells the story of  how he faced the problems outside and inside Magadha, eventually rising to become its ruler. The historical drama was produced by Contiloe Entertainment and directed by Prasad Gavandi. The show premiered on 2 February 2015 with a 1-hour telecast duration for the first 20 episodes. The serial ended on 7 October 2016.

Plot

This series starts when Magadha is ruled by Emperor Bindusara Maurya. Bindusara's step-mother, Helena conspires against him. Bindusara is attacked but is saved by a Brahmin woman in Champa named Dharma. Bindusara is amazed at her and marries her. Dharma then conceives a child. She refuses to visit royal palace with Bindusara, who promised her to return. Bindusara's third queen, Noor and her father, Mir Khorasan, seek to assassinate Dharma. Mir attacks Dharma and kills her father. He then sets her hut on fire. Bindusara assumes Dharma to be dead, but Dharma survives and gives birth to a son, Ashoka.

14 years later

Ashoka is now grown into a brave boy and lives with Dharma in a hamlet. Chanakya spots Ashoka and finds his truth, but promises Dharma to keep it a secret. Chanakya and his disciple, Radhagupta takes them to Pataliputra disguising Dharma as a royal physician. Ashoka impresses Bindusara and they develop a bond, irritating Bindusara's eldest son, Sushim, his mother Charumitra, Mir Khorasan, Helena and her son, Justin. Eventually, Ashoka finds about his father and reunites Bindusara and Dharma. Chanakya is trapped and set in fire by Helena, Khallatak, Charumitra, Sushim and Siamak. Ashoka saves him from fire and Chanakya dies asking Ashoka to become the Emperor and realize his dream of Akhanda Bharat. Ashoka is shattered and vows to catch the murderers.

Later, Ashoka is succeed in saving Taxila from Kichak. He falls in love with Kaurvaki, the princess of Kalinga. Helena reveals Ashoka about the murders of Chanakya and fakes a suicide. Ashoka is enraged and stabs Sushim and banished by Bindusara. Dharma and her newborn son Vitashoka (Vit) accompany him to Ujjain and Ashoka vows to come back stronger and avenge Chanakya's death.

10 years later

Ashoka, now known as Chand, has become a ruthless, angry man who just wants revenge. He lives with Dharma and Vit in the house of a merchant named Dhaniram. Dhaniram's daughter, Devi cares about them. Sushima has become stronger with the help of the black magic of Charumitra. Siamak has grown into a cool-headed man but thirsts for the death of Ashoka. Ashoka takes part in a wrestling contest with Sushim as Chand. Dharma and Vit come there and stop Ashoka. Bindusara recognizes them, forgives Ashoka, and asks him to come back to Pataliputra.

Ashoka exposes Helena, who is still alive as Kondana. Siamak is tricked and kills Helena. Ashoka and Sushim are supposed to marry Kaurvaki and Chanda. Kaurvaki's father, Jagannath insults Bindusara and Dharma and asks the throne of Magadha. Ashoka is enraged and marries Devi, calling off his marriage with Kaurvaki. Dharma is killed by Sushim and Bindusara also dies due a cardiac arrest caused by Charumitra's blackmagic, leaving Ashoka broken. He suspects Siamak to be Dharma's murderer and kills him. Sushim stabs Charumitra to death, mistaking her to be Kaurvaki. Khallatak teams up with Ashok. Sushim confesses his crimes. After a fierce war, Sushim falls into a lava pit and dies. Ashoka is crowned as the third emperor of Magadha.

Some time later 
Devi gives birth to their son, Mahindra and later their daughter, Sanghamitta. Ashoka captures Kalinga and draws a massive amount of bloodshed, killing millions of people. This incident leaves him traumatized at the waste of human lives. He later on, decides to give up violence and embraces Buddhism. With the help of his children and ministers, he propagates the principles of Buddhism around the world for the welfare of mankind and earns the title of "Ashoka the Great", also fulfilling Chanakya's dream of Akhanda Bharath (Greater India).

Cast

Main cast

Supporting cast

Production and promotion
The set was erected in Karjat. The show was produced by Contiloe Entertainment. A team of at least 500 people worked on the series. Episodes were shot across Jaisalmer, Kerala, Mumbai's Film City and Karjat. A lightman died on the set in April 2015.

Chakravartin Ashoka Samrat was promoted on the comedy show Comedy Nights with Kapil on the occasion of Maha Shivaratri in February 2015 A game app "Ashoka:The Game" was launched by Colors TV in April 2015.

Awards

Critical reception
The Times of India praised Ashok Banker's reconstruction filled historical gaps and stated that they provide "interesting fictional turns" for the show.

Bollywood Life reviewer, Letty Mariam Abraham, gave the show 3 out of 5 stars; praising the sets, visual effects and production value of the show. She further heaped praise on child prodigy Siddharth Nigam as "undoubtedly a brilliant actor"; stating that "his agile body makes him the perfect actor for the role." Abraham gave her final verdict as "the show looks promising but has a lot of scope for improvement. I'd recommend that people watch this historical drama for Siddharth Nigam and the special effects of the show."

India.com reviewer, Prathamesh Jadhav, stated "going by the opening episode we must confess that this elaborate drama looks rather promising with its interesting tale." He further stated, "What we liked though is the visuals and the diligence that has been put in by the special effects and VFX team. The work is seriously commendable." He gave his final verdict as "going by what we have seen [in] it one must admit that the show looks promising with its actors, its sets and the details that have gone into making a tele-series of this nature."

Additionally it has been known to imitate its style and fictional characters from Game of Thrones.

International broadcast
  In Myanmar, it airs under the title "ဘုန်းမီးနေလ မဟာအသောက" on 5 plus.
  In Cambodia, it airs under the title ព្រះបាទអសោក on Cambodian Television Network.
  In Indonesia, it began airing under the title, Ashoka on 11 May 2015 on antv.
  In Sri Lanka, it airs under the title, Adiraja Dharmashoka on TV Derana from 23 May 2015.
  in Thailand, it airs under the title, อโศกมหาราช on Channel 3 Family
  in Vietnam it airs under the title, Ashoka Đại Đế on THVL1 at 12h00 trưa
 in Ghana under the title Ashoka Samrat on Joy Prime.
 in Kenya on KBC under the title Ashoka at 1830 hours.
  In South Africa, it began airing under the title, Emperor Ashoka in 2021 on glowtv at 19h00CAT.

See also
 Chandragupta Maurya (2011 TV series)
 Chanakya (TV series)
 Bharatvarsh (TV series)
 Chandra Nandini
Aśoka (film)

References

External links

Indian historical television series
Indian period television series
Colors TV original programming
Hindi-language television shows
Indian drama television series
2015 Indian television series debuts
Memorials to Ashoka
2016 Indian television series endings
Works about the Maurya Empire
Cultural depictions of Ashoka